Telenovela is an American single-camera sitcom television series starring Eva Longoria and Jencarlos Canela. The series is a behind-the-scenes look at a fictional telenovela (Latin American soap opera) that is shot in Miami, Florida, and follows the daily life of the show's star, who does not speak Spanish. The series premiered on December 7, 2015 on NBC, and concluded on February 22, 2016.

On May 13, 2016, NBC canceled the series after one season.

Cast and characters

Main
Eva Longoria as Ana Sofia Calderon, the neurotic star of Las Leyes de Pasión
Jencarlos Canela as Xavier (Xavi) Castillo, Ana Sofia's ex-husband, recently hired to co-star on her show
Diana-Maria Riva as Mimi Moncada, Ana Sofia's best friend and the show's clothing designer and seamstress
Amaury Nolasco as Rodrigo Suarez, Ana Sofia's co-star who plays the show's villain
Jose Moreno Brooks as Gael Garnica, Ana Sofia's gay friend and co-star who plays her love interest on the show
Jadyn Douglas as Roxi Rios, the show's youngest cast member who is dimwitted yet insightful
Alex Meneses as Isabela Santamaria, the telenovela's aging former leading lady and Ana Sofia's chief rival 
Izzy Diaz as Isaac Aguero, the show's head writer who drunkenly writes the episodes only to forget the scenes he wrote the next day

Recurring
 Zachary Levi as James McMahon, the new network president of VivaVision; much to Ana Sofia's irritation, he speaks more Spanish than she does.
 Juan Carlos Cantu as Gustavo
 Phillip Garcia as Paulo, the show's PA
 Luis Fernandez-Gil as Director
 Roselyn Sánchez cameo as a reporter on TV

Production 
On January 16, 2015, NBC ordered thirteen episodes. On October 19, 2015, the network cut its order to eleven episodes. In November, the show title was switched from the production title Hot & Bothered to Telenovela.

Episodes

Broadcast
Telenovela premiered as a "preview" on December 7, 2015 on NBC. The series then moved to its regular Monday at 8:30 PM timeslot on December 21, 2015 as a mid-season replacement.

Reception

Ratings

Critical reception
According to Metacritic, Telenovela currently holds a score of 62 out of 100, based on 21 critics indicating "generally favorable reviews". On another review aggregator website Rotten Tomatoes, the series holds a critical approval of 63%, based on 19 critics, with an average rating of 5.9/10. The site's critical consensus reads, "Featuring a likable cast led by a charming Eva Longoria, Telenovela is a comedy that provides entertainingly predictable laughs".

References

External links 

2010s American single-camera sitcoms
2015 American television series debuts
2016 American television series endings
English-language television shows
NBC original programming
Television series about television
Television series by Universal Television
Television shows set in Miami